Polypogon tentacularia is a species of litter moth of the family Erebidae. The species was first described by Carl Linnaeus in his 1758 10th edition of Systema Naturae. It is found in Europe.

The moth flies from June to July depending on the location.

The larvae feed on Taraxacum officinale, goldenrod and hawkweed.

References

External links

"Polypogon tentacularia (Linnaeus, 1758)". Lepidoptera of Belgium. Archived 24 March 2017.
"08849 Polypogon tentacularia (Linnaeus, 1758) - Palpen-Spannereule". Lepiforum e.V. Retrieved 29 January 2020.

Herminiinae
Moths described in 1758
Moths of Japan
Moths of Europe
Moths of Asia
Taxa named by Carl Linnaeus